Raniero Alliata di Pietratagliata or more correctly "of the Duchi di Pietratagliata" (Palermo, 1886 – 1979) was an Italian intellectual, theosophist and entomologist. His insect collection is conserved in museum in Terrasini. It includes purchased exotic insects. He lived in Villa Alliata di Pietratagliata in Palermo.

External links
Museo regionale di Terrasini
 the entomological collection 

Alliata family
Italian entomologists
1886 births
1979 deaths
Scientists from Palermo
20th-century Italian zoologists